Donald Dombo Ngoma (born 23 September 1989) is a Zimbabwean professional footballer, who plays as a forward for Tanzanian club Polokwane City and the Zimbabwe national team.

Career

Club
Ngoma's career started with a short spell with Monomotapa United in 2011, before he made the move to Platinum in 2012. During his time with Platinum he has won four trophies, including the Zimbabwean Independence Trophy twice. In 2014, Ngoma went on trial with Swedish club Örebro but failed to win a contract. He returned to Platinum and remained there for one more year before leaving to join Young Africans of Tanzania. His debut season with Young Africans ended with a trophy as the club won the 2015–16 Tanzanian Premier League.

International
In January 2014, coach Ian Gorowa, invited him to be a part of the Zimbabwe squad for the 2014 African Nations Championship. He helped the team to a fourth-place finish after being defeated by Nigeria by a goal to nil. He made a total of three appearances at the 2014 African Nations Championship for Zimbabwe. Two of his first three goals for his nation came during the 2011 CECAFA Cup.

Career statistics

International
.

International goals
. Scores and results list Zimbabwe's goal tally first.

Honours

Club
Platinum
 Zimbabwean Independence Trophy (2): 2012, 2014
 Cup of Zimbabwe (1): 2014

Young Africans
 Tanzanian Premier League (1): 2015–16

References

Living people
Sportspeople from Kwekwe
Zimbabwean expatriate footballers
Zimbabwean footballers
Zimbabwe international footballers
Zimbabwe A' international footballers
2014 African Nations Championship players
Expatriate footballers in Tanzania
Young Africans S.C. players
1989 births
Association football forwards
Tanzanian Premier League players